The copperstripe rasbora (Rasbora leptosoma) is a species of ray-finned fish in the genus Rasbora from Sumatra, Indonesia.

References

Rasboras
Freshwater fish of Sumatra
Endemic fauna of Sumatra
Taxa named by Pieter Bleeker
Fish described in 1855